Kluyvera ascorbata is a bacterium, the type species of its genus. It is Gram-negative, rod-shaped and motile with peritrichous flagella.

References

Further reading

Carter, J. Elliot, and Tara N. Evans. "Clinically Significant Kluyvera Infections A Report of Seven Cases." American Journal of Clinical Pathology 123.3 (2005): 334–338.

External links

LPSN
Type strain of Kluyvera ascorbata at BacDive -  the Bacterial Diversity Metadatabase

Enterobacteriaceae
Gram-negative bacteria
Bacteria described in 1981